Antennaria media is a North American species of flowering plants in the family Asteraceae known by the common name Rocky Mountain pussytoes. It is native to western Canada and the Western United States from Alaska and Yukon Territory to California to New Mexico. It grows in cold Arctic and alpine regions, either at high latitudes in the Arctic or at high elevations in the mountains (Rocky Mountains, Cascades, Sierra Nevada).

Antennaria media is a perennial herb forming a matted patch of stolons and woolly basal leaves with inflorescences no more than about 13 centimeters tall. The inflorescences contain several flower heads. The species is dioecious, with male and female flowers on different plants. The fruit is an achene up to about 6 millimeters long, most of which is the long, soft pappus.

Subspecies
There are several subspecies; one subspecies is diploid and reproduces sexually and the others are polyploid and display apomixis.

References

External links
Jepson Manual Treatment
United States Department of Agriculture Plants Profile
Calphotos Photo gallery, University of California

media
Alpine flora
Plants described in 1898
Flora of Subarctic America
Flora of Western Canada
Flora of the Northwestern United States
Flora of the Southwestern United States
Flora of the South-Central United States
Flora without expected TNC conservation status